Bahía de Loreto National Park is a national park on the east coast of the Baja California Peninsula in Mexico, about  north of the city of La Paz in the state of Baja California Sur. The park protects  of relatively pristine marine ecosystem in the central Sea of Cortez, including five large uninhabited islands and many smaller islets in Loreto Bay. It is known for its great variety of coastal environments, such as sandy beaches, sea cliffs, submarine canyons, and marine terraces, and is home to an exceptionally high biological diversity, especially of marine mammals.

The national park was created by federal decree on July 19, 1996, and is administered by the Natural Commission of Protected Natural Areas (CONANP), an agency of Mexico's Secretariat of Environment and Natural Resources. In 2004, it joined the Ramsar list of Wetlands of International Importance, and in 2005, it was declared a UNESCO World Heritage Site collectively with many other protected areas in the Gulf of California.

Description
Bahía de Loreto National Park protects Loreto Bay, located in northwest Mexico off the coast of Loreto Municipality in the state of Baja California Sur; the city of Loreto abuts park territory.

Five main islands serve as the park's chief focal points and tourist destinations: Isla Coronados, Isla del Carmen, Isla Danzante, Isla Monserrat, and Isla Santa Catalina. Though the municipality of Loreto is not within park boundaries, it is the primary starting point for tours of the park and is considered a major influence on the area's ecology. The municipality had a population of 11,812 at the 2000 census.

See also
List of national parks of Mexico

References

External links
Loreto.com
 Interactive map of the new Zoning of the Bahia de Loreto National Park

National parks of Mexico
Ramsar sites in Mexico
World Heritage Sites in Mexico
Protected areas of Baja California Sur
1996 establishments in Mexico
Natural history of Baja California
Natural history of Baja California Sur
Pacific Coast of Mexico
Bays of Mexico on the Pacific Ocean